Hedrick is an unincorporated community in Dent County, in the U.S. state of Missouri.

History
A post office called Hedrick was established in 1884 and remained in operation until 1907. The community takes its name from Cicero P. Hedrick, a local judge.

References

Unincorporated communities in Dent County, Missouri
Unincorporated communities in Missouri